Friedrich Wilhelm Heinrich Paul Wentzcke (September 4, 1879 – November 25, 1960) was a German academic, archivist, and historian.

References

1879 births
1960 deaths
20th-century German historians